The Abraham Lincoln National Cemetery covers  in Elwood, Illinois. When fully completed, it will provide 400,000 burial spaces.

The cemetery was dedicated in 1999 by the United States Department of Veterans Affairs National Cemetery Administration.  It was the 117th national cemetery dedicated under the administration.  The cemetery is on the grounds of the former Joliet Army Ammunition Plant site, which was formerly known as the Joliet Arsenal.

The cemetery is named after President Abraham Lincoln, the 16th President of the United States and founder of the National Cemetery system and who is buried at Oak Ridge Cemetery in Springfield, Illinois.

In 2015 the first American federally approved monument honoring LGBT veterans was dedicated at the cemetery.

Notable burials
 Johnny Bach (1924–2016), professional basketball player and coach
 Johnny Carter (1934–2009), jazz vocalist
 Iceal Hambleton (1918–2004), USAF Vietnam War pilot
 Theodore Hyatt (1830–1900), recipient of the Medal of Honor for action in the Siege of Vicksburg
 Mary L. Petty (1916–2001), 1st black woman captain in the US Army Nurse Corps
 George E. Sangmeister (1931–2007), US Representative
 Gus Savage (1925–2015), US Representative

References

External links 
 Abraham Lincoln National Cemetery
 
 

Cemeteries in Illinois
United States national cemeteries
Protected areas of Will County, Illinois
1999 establishments in Illinois